Open Range is a lost 1927 American silent Western film directed by Clifford Smith and written by Roy Briant, Zane Grey, J. Walter Ruben and John Stone. The film stars Betty Bronson, Lane Chandler, Fred Kohler, Bernard Siegel, Guy Oliver, Jim Corey and Buck Connors. The film was released on November 11, 1927, by Paramount Pictures.

Plot
Hired ranch-hand Tex Smith is smitten with Lucy Blake, who lives in the cattle settlement of Marco. Meanwhile, Indian chief Brave Bear despises the encroachment of white people and conspires with Sam Hardman to steal the town's cattle during a rodeo. Tex is mistakenly identified as one of the rustlers. At the rodeo, he tries to impress Lucy by riding a bronco. When she loses control of her horse team in the buggy race, he rescues her then must evade the sheriff's men. Red and Hardman plan to get Tex before the sheriff gets him, but Lucy, convinced he is innocent, hides him at her ranch. Tex discovers the gang's hideout and forces a confession from Hardman, who warns Brave Bear. When the Indians attack the town, Tex and his men start a cattle stampede, and Tex saves Lucy and her father from their burning house. Hardman dies, after falling on his own knife.

Cast 
 Betty Bronson as Lucy Blake
 Lane Chandler as Tex Smith
 Fred Kohler as Sam Hardman
 Bernard Siegel as Brave Bear
 Guy Oliver as Jim Blake
 Jim Corey as Red
 Buck Connors as Sheriff Daley

References

External links 
 
 

1927 films
1920s English-language films
1927 Western (genre) films
Paramount Pictures films
American black-and-white films
Lost Western (genre) films
Lost American films
Films directed by Clifford Smith
1927 lost films
Silent American Western (genre) films
1920s American films